Kempe Fjord is a fjord in King Christian X Land, eastern Greenland.

Administratively it lies in the Northeast Greenland National Park area. This fjord is part of the King Oscar Fjord system.

History
This fjord was named by a Swedish Arctic explorer Alfred Gabriel Nathorst after a Stockholm businessman Seth Michael Kempe (1857– 1946),  during the Swedish Greenland Expedition in search of survivors of S. A. Andrée's Arctic balloon expedition of 1897. Kempe was one of Nathorst's most generous supporters and also a good friend of expedition surveyor Per Dusén.

In 1899, while first exploring King Oscar Fjord, Nathorst wanted to reach the sea through Davy Sound, which had been put on the map by William Scoresby in 1822, but the sound was blocked by ice. While travelling back north he found and mapped both this fjord branch, as well as the Segelsällskapet Fjord further south.

Geography
This fjord is the northernmost of the western branches of the King Oscar Fjord. Its mouth opens at the western end of Ella Island, where the Narwhal Sound branches southeastwards. It extends roughly southwestwards for about  until Cape Hedlund, from where the fjord divides into three branches:
Dickson Fjord, extends to the WNW for another . The terminus of the Hisingers Glacier is at its head.
At its head there is a sloping valley.
The terminus of the Wahlenberg Glacier is at its head.

The northwestern shore of the fjord forms the southern shore of Suess Land, and the southeastern, the northern shore of Lyell Land. Gletscherland lies to the west of the fjord system.

The Argand Glacier has its terminus in the fjord.

See also
List of fjords of Greenland

References

External links
Simplified geologic map of Central Fjord region of East Greenland

Fjords of Greenland